The NBA Slam Dunk Contest (officially known as the AT&T Slam Dunk) is an annual National Basketball Association (NBA) competition held during the NBA All-Star Weekend. Sports Illustrated wrote "the dunk contest was the best halftime invention since the bathroom."

The contest was conceived of and started by the American Basketball Association (ABA) for its 1976 ABA All-Star Game in Denver. The winner was Julius Erving of the New York Nets. As a result of the ABA–NBA merger later that year, the contest moved to the NBA for the 1976-77 season.

There was not another slam dunk contest at the professional level until 1984. The contest has adopted several formats over the years, including, until 2014, the use of fan voting, via text-messaging, to determine the winner of the final round. The current champion of the Slam Dunk Contest is Mac McClung of the Philadelphia 76ers.

History

1976 ABA Slam Dunk Contest
The first-ever Slam Dunk Contest was held on January 27, 1976 at McNichols Sports Arena in Denver during halftime of the 1976 ABA All-Star Game, the league's final All-Star game before the completion of the ABA–NBA merger. In financial trouble and fighting with the NBA for viewers, the ABA started the slam dunk contest as a gimmick to attract viewers nationwide. In Remember the ABA, Jim Bukata recalled, "We were sitting around the office one day, discussing things that would draw more people, and it just came to us…It was Julius [Erving] really giving us the idea that we're the league of the dunkers. So we said, 'Well if that's the case, let's have a contest.' It really was as simple as that. …Three guys talking about what we could do to sell a few more tickets." Bukata was the director of marketing and public relations for the ABA. The other two in the room were the league's finance director Jim Keeler and Carl Scheer, general manager of the Denver Nuggets who were hosting the All-Star game.

There was a format each competitor had to follow in which they must attempt five dunks in a row under two minutes, with the clock stopping after each shot to allow the player to plan their next attempt. One required dunk was from a standing position under the basket, and another from a distance of ten feet away from the basket in the foul lane. The next three required dunks were freestyle positions, one coming in from the left side of the basket, one coming in from the right side of the basket, and finally from either corner down the baseline to the basket. At the contest, it was announced that the competitors were judged on artistic ability, body flow, fan response, and imagination, earning up to ten points in each category. There were $1,200 in prizes provided by the Denver Nuggets and KHOW radio station.

There were five competitors: Artis "A-Train" Gilmore of the Kentucky Colonels went first followed by George "Iceman" Gervin of the San Antonio Spurs, Larry "Special K" Kenon of the San Antonio Spurs, David "Skywalker" Thompson of the Denver Nuggets, and finally Julius "Dr. J" Erving of New York Nets.

Rookie and shortest competitor in the contest, Thompson  recalls, "Since my hands weren't very big, I couldn't really palm the ball so I would cup it. I'd cup it with my left hand between my hand and forearm and put it above the rim and come over the top with my right hand and punch it into the basket. Very few guys could do it, I was told that Wilt Chamberlain could do something like it but I never seen it. You not only had to be able to jump high but you had to have the hang time, you had to be able to levitate up there and punch it through the basket.” Thompson performed a 360 degree or twist-around dunk to finish his routine—the first time this trick had ever been seen. However, Thompson missed a dunk during his routine which counted as a zero; Gervin missed two dunks.

All competitors had to perform a dunk from ten feet, but Julius Erving started marking his steps from the free throw line which is fifteen feet away. Erving then completed a dunk from the free throw line, winning the contest. He said, "I just wanted to make a nice, soaring play that would get the fans out of their seats. I really started going at half court and got a good running start and made sure that I made the shot authoritatively."

Erving said that his favorite dunk of the night was by Thompson who "came out of the corner, spun 360 degrees in the air and slammed it, 50 by anyone's standards.” One basketball historian wrote, "The 1976 Slam Dunk Contest represents a key focal point in basketball history. David Thompson and the rest of the ABA players were true pioneers and innovators; they transcended the game of basketball into what it is today."

1976–77 NBA Slam Dunk Contest
In 1976, Arthur Erhat filed a patent for "a rim that had give but immediately returned to its original position," making dunking safe for the first time by significantly reducing the shattering of backboards. After a ten-year ban, the NBA brought back the dunk to regular play for the 1976-77 season. That year, NBA held its first Slam Dunk Contest as a one-off, season-long event similar to NBA Horse event held the following season. During halftime at each game, there was a one-on-one slam dunk competition.

There were 22 competitors at multiple venues throughout the event—one for each team at the league—including future Hall of Famers Kareem Abdul-Jabbar, Alex English, Julius Erving, George Gervin, Elvin Hayes, Moses Malone, and David Thompson. Former ABA player Darnell "Dr. Dunk" Hillman was named the winner that season, beating out the Golden State Warriors' Larry McNeill in the championship round on June 5, 1977 in Portland during the halftime of the final playoff game. Although he received the winner's $15,000 check, Hillman did not receive a trophy until 2017.

1980s
The NBA reintroduced the Slam Dunk Contest on a permanent basis as a free-standing event during All-Star Weekend in 1984 at its birthplace in Denver. Phoenix's Larry Nance defeated the original Dunk contest winner Julius Erving in the final round. Dominique Wilkins won the contest the following year, but in 1986 his Atlanta Hawks teammate Spud Webb made history when he defeated Wilkins in the final, preventing him from retaining his title. Standing a mere 5 feet 6 inches tall, Webb became the shortest player ever to win the contest, a distinction that he still holds. Chicago's Michael Jordan won back-to-back dunk contest victories in 1987 and in 1988. His victory over Wilkins in 1988 in Chicago finished with a perfect 50 dunk from the free-throw line for his third dunk to win the contest.  However, the announcers did note that Wilkins was given abnormally low score for his breathtaking third dunk, a 45, allowing Jordan to win it by 2 with his perfect 50. To this day, the allegations of "home cooking" still float around surrounding the event (it was held on Jordan's home court; one of the judges was former Chicago Bears star Gale Sayers; and another judge, former NBA star Tom Hawkins, is a Chicago native) and until the competition in 2020, was considered arguably the most controversial of the slam dunk competitions. Extensive debate continues whether Wilkins 3rd dunk should have scored higher than a 45 and whether Jordan's second dunk, which scored a 47, was a superior creative effort to Wilkins third dunk. The following year in Houston, New York's Kenny "Sky" Walker, a last-minute replacement whose father died just days beforehand, upset Portland's Clyde Drexler, the hometown favorite and Houston native who was seen as the favorite, being that other previous champs Larry Nance, Michael Jordan and Dominique Wilkins were not competing. 1986 champ Spud Webb finished 3rd, while Shelton Jones finished 4th. Though Nance, Jordan and Wilkins still played in the All-Star Game, Nance and Jordan chose not to compete due to minor injuries, and Wilkins did not compete in the competition due to a hand injury.

1990s
In 1990, Dominique Wilkins of the Atlanta Hawks edged out Kenny Smith of the Sacramento Kings to win his second Slam Dunk Contest. He first won it in 1985 over Michael Jordan. Smith scored high points for originality with his signature dunk—he started by turning his back to the basket, bouncing the ball backward between his legs and off the backboard, then turning and grabbing it in the air and reverse dunking it. As the 1990s progressed, stars such as Jordan, Wilkins and Drexler sometimes declined to participate and were replaced by less-known players. Harold Miner was a standout in 1993, winning the contest with a reverse power dunk, reaching between his legs and down to his feet in mid-air before sending the ball down. In 1994 and 1997 respectively, Isaiah Rider and Kobe Bryant won the contest. Rider would win with a spectacular, between-the-legs dunk, reminiscent of the Orlando Woolridge effort in the 1984 contest. However, he wasn't able to repeat in 1995, missing the same dunk on several tries, opening the way for Miner to grab his second slam dunk title in three years. In 1998, the Slam Dunk Contest was replaced with the WNBA-NBA 2Ball Contest. In 1999, there was no All-Star Game due to the NBA lockout.

2000s
After a one-All Star Weekend layoff (as aforementioned, the NBA did not have an All Star Weekend due to the lockout the previous season), the NBA decided to bring the Slam Dunk Contest back for the 2000 All-Star Weekend in Oakland, California. It would prove to be one of the most electrifying dunk contests in the league's history, featuring a great showdown between eventual winner Vince Carter of the Toronto Raptors, his cousin and then-teammate Tracy McGrady, and the Houston Rockets' Steve Francis. Carter won after performing a number of very impressive dunks, including two 360 windmills, a honey dip, and a between-the-legs dunk off a bounced alley-oop from McGrady. The next four contests did not feature superstars like Carter and Bryant, and despite innovative efforts by the likes of Desmond Mason and Jason Richardson, the lack of A-list superstars willing to participate hurt the appeal of the contest.

In 2005, the Slam Dunk Contest returned to its birthplace in Denver. With the spectacular dunks of prior contests, there was buzz that the dunk competition could regain the popularity it had in the 1980s. The Phoenix Suns' Amar'e Stoudemire alley-ooping 360 off a soccer-style header from teammate Steve Nash; J. R. Smith putting it around his back and dunking, and the new champion, Josh Smith alley-ooping over Kenyon Martin all wowed the crowd with their maneuvers. With the change in the rules requiring an additional teammate starting in the second round, they proved there were indeed many ways to dunk a basketball that had not been done before. Amar'e Stoudemire received rave reviews, as did Smith when he did a tribute dunk to Dominique Wilkins while donning Wilkins' jersey.

Again in 2006, the Dunk Contest in Houston revitalized the interests of audiences as 5'9" Nate Robinson of the New York Knicks took the title with a great dunk-off. One of his most exciting dunks was a high-flying dunk over former Slam Dunk Contest winner, 5'7" Spud Webb. The 2006 Slam Dunk Contest was also the first Dunk Contest in history to have a "Dunk Off", the equivalent to a Dunk Contest overtime, between Knicks point guard Nate Robinson and shooting guard Andre Iguodala of the Philadelphia 76ers. Many fans argue that Iguodala should have won the contest, as it took Robinson fourteen attempts before finally completing his dunk. Iguodala pulled off a dunk where he started out of bounds from the right side of the baseline while teammate Allen Iverson bounced the ball off the back of the right side of the backboard. Iguodala caught the ball in mid-air behind the backboard, spun around to the other side while ducking his head (to avoid colliding with the backboard) and dunked it with his right hand.

On February 17, 2007, the contest was held in Las Vegas. Judges for the event were all past winners: Michael Jordan, Dominique Wilkins, Kobe Bryant, Julius Erving, and Vince Carter. The title was taken by the Boston Celtics' Gerald Green, who, among other dunks, jumped over reigning champ Nate Robinson while covering his face – a homage to 1991 winner, Dee Brown, whose jersey Green had worn. He also scored a perfect fifty with his last slam, a windmill over a table. Other noteworthy dunks include a dunk by Orlando Magic center Dwight Howard, who, while making his dunk, stuck a sticker with his smiling face on the backboard a reported 12'6" from the ground, two and a half feet beyond the regulation NBA rim.

On February 16, 2008, the contest was held in New Orleans. Judges for the event included Darryl Dawkins, Dominique Wilkins, Karl Malone, Julius Erving, and Magic Johnson. The title was taken by Orlando Magic center Dwight Howard. Howard's most noteworthy dunk came during the first round, his second dunk overall, when he took off his jersey to reveal a Superman shirt and cape. With teammate Jameer Nelson's assistance he would make a leaping dunk from just in front of the free-throw line after a running start, throwing the ball through the rim from a few feet away. Other noteworthy dunks included the first round slam by Jamario Moon while the previous year's winner, Gerald Green, relied heavily on theatrics by blowing out a cupcake with a birthday candle on the rim before dunking (a jam he termed "The Birthday Cake"). For the first time ever, fan voting determined the outcome of the final round of the contest; Howard beat Green for the trophy by claiming 78% of the fans' votes.

Nate Robinson won the 2009 contest on February 14 in Phoenix, Arizona. The 5'9" guard dressed all in green as "Krypto-Nate" (a portmanteau of 'Nate' and Kryptonite) and jumped over 6'11" Dwight Howard characterized as Superman. He defeated Howard in the finals by a fan vote of 52–48 percent. J. R. Smith and Rudy Fernández also competed.

2010s
Nate Robinson won the 2010 contest on February 13 in Dallas, becoming the first 3-time Slam Dunk champion. Robinson took on Shannon Brown of the Los Angeles Lakers, Gerald Wallace of the Charlotte Bobcats, and DeMar DeRozan of the Toronto Raptors. DeRozan earned his spot in the competition by defeating Los Angeles Clippers guard Eric Gordon in the inaugural Sprite Slam Dunk-In held the night before the actual dunk contest. Robinson and DeRozan advanced to the final round, where Robinson's double-pump reverse dunk helped seal a 51% to 49% victory.

Blake Griffin won the 2011 slam dunk contest by jumping and dunking over the hood of a Kia sedan on February 19 in Los Angeles. JaVale McGee of the Washington Wizards, DeMar DeRozan of the Toronto Raptors, and Serge Ibaka of the Oklahoma City Thunder all competed against Griffin. Griffin and McGee advanced to the final round, where Griffin stole the show, winning the contest with 68% of the vote.

Jeremy Evans won the 2012 Sprite Slam Dunk Contest by performing a dunk over Kevin Hart on February 25 in Orlando, Florida with 29% of the votes. Joining Evans were Chase Budinger of the Houston Rockets, Paul George of the Indiana Pacers, and Derrick Williams of the Minnesota Timberwolves. While George awed the crowd with a dunk with the lights turned off, Evans had perhaps the dunk of the contest by jumping teammate Gordon Hayward, catching two balls from Hayward, and dunking it.

Terrence Ross won the 2013 Sprite Slam Dunk Contest after a tomahawk dunk in tribute to former Toronto Raptors player Vince Carter, as well as a between-the-legs dunk performed while jumping over a ball boy. Ross took on Jeremy Evans of the Utah Jazz, Eric Bledsoe of the Los Angeles Clippers, Kenneth Faried of the Denver Nuggets, Gerald Green of the Indiana Pacers, and James White of the New York Knicks. Evans advanced to the final round to defend his title of slam dunk champion, but was thwarted by Ross. Ross carried the momentum of his near-perfect first round, in which he scored a 99 out of a possible 100, with a stellar final round. Ross won the competition decisively, earning 58% of the vote.

Team East, composed of dunkers Paul George, defending champion Terrence Ross, and John Wall won the 2014 Sprite Slam Dunk Contest in commanding fashion. Under the new team format, they dominated the Freestyle Round, capping it off with a pass off the backboard from Ross to Wall, then off the shot clock from Wall to George for the finish. In the Battle Round, Ross defeated Damian Lillard with a through the legs dunk from rapper Drake, George took down Harrison Barnes with a 360-degree, through the legs finish, and Wall defeated Ben McLemore by jumping over the Wizards' mascot G-Man and throwing down a reverse on the first try. Though Team East are the official winners, Wall was voted by fans as the Dunker of the Night.

To the delight of NBA fans, the 2015 contest was changed back to its original format, as the Freestyle Round as well as the teams were taken out.  The 4 dunkers competing were all up-and-coming players: The Bucks' Giannis Antetokounmpo, the Timberwolves' Zach LaVine, the Magic's Victor Oladipo, and the Nets' Mason Plumlee.  LaVine took home the hardware with dunks that included a between-the-legs reverse, a behind-the-back slam in which he caught it in midair, a between-the-legs lefthanded dunk, and finished with a between-the-legs dunk as he caught it off the pole behind the backboard. Similar to Howard with Superman, LaVine did his first dunk with a cultural homage, wearing Michael Jordan's jersey from Space Jam.

Zach LaVine won the 2016 slam dunk contest with incredibly talented dunks, from a windmill from the free throw line to a sensational between-the-legs reverse dunk. Aaron Gordon (runner-up) of the Orlando Magic, Will Barton of the Denver Nuggets and Andre Drummond of the Detroit Pistons also competed.

Controversy over Dunk Contest authenticity
Many people, including 2010 winner Nate Robinson, thought that the 2011 contest was rigged to allow up-and-coming star Blake Griffin to win and that runner-up JaVale McGee deserved to win. It was even disputed if Griffin even legitimately qualified for the finals since his final dunk got a perfect score but was basically a copy of DeMar DeRozan's first dunk with a lower degree of difficulty. Ben Maller of Fox Sports Radio reported that a media advisory sent out by the NBA over an hour before the 2011 Slam Dunk Contest began already referring to Blake Griffin as the winner.

Slam Dunk Contest champions
The 1976 event was held during the ABA All-Star game.

Slam Dunk Contest champions by franchise

All-time participants
Bold denotes winner(s) of that year.

Mahmoud Abdul-Rauf: 1993
Ray Allen: 1997
Chris Andersen: 2004, 2005
Greg Anderson: 1988
Nick Anderson: 1992
Giannis Antetokounmpo: 2015
Cole Anthony: 2022
Darrell Armstrong: 1996
Stacey Augmon: 1992
Harrison Barnes: 2014
Brent Barry: 1996
Will Barton: 2016
Kenny Battle: 1990
Jonathan Bender: 2001
David Benoit: 1993
Eric Bledsoe: 2013
Miles Bridges: 2019
Dee Brown: 1991
Shannon Brown: 2010
Kobe Bryant: 1997
Chase Budinger: 2012
Chris Carr: 1997
Vince Carter: 2000
Cedric Ceballos: 1992, 1993
Tom Chambers: 1987
Rex Chapman: 1990, 1991
Doug Christie: 1996
John Collins: 2019
Michael Cooper: 1984
Pat Connaughton: 2020
Antonio Davis: 1994
Baron Davis: 2001
Ricky Davis: 2000, 2004
Johnny Dawkins: 1987
DeMar DeRozan: 2010, 2011
Hamidou Diallo: 2019
Clyde Drexler: 1984, 1985, 1987, 1988, 1989
Andre Drummond: 2016
Tony Dumas: 1995
Blue Edwards: 1991
Julius Erving: 1984, 1985
Jeremy Evans: 2012, 2013
Rudy Fernández: 2009
Michael Finley: 1996, 1997
Steve Francis: 2000, 2002
Rudy Gay: 2008, 2009
Paul George: 2012, 2014
Kendall Gill: 1991
Aaron Gordon: 2016, 2017, 2020
Gerald Green: 2007, 2008, 2013
Jalen Green: 2022
Blake Griffin: 2011
Darrell Griffith: 1984, 1985
Darvin Ham: 1997
Ron Harper: 1987, 1989
Antonio Harvey: 1995
Roy Hinson: 1986
Allan Houston: 1994
Dwight Howard: 2007, 2008, 2009, 2020
Larry Hughes: 2000
Serge Ibaka: 2011
Andre Iguodala: 2006
Richard Jefferson: 2003
Larry Johnson: 1992
Derrick Jones Jr.: 2017, 2020
Edgar Jones: 1984
Fred Jones: 2004
Shelton Jones: 1989
DeAndre Jordan: 2017
Michael Jordan: 1985, 1987, 1988
Shawn Kemp: 1990, 1991, 1992, 1994
Jerome Kersey: 1986, 1987, 1988, 1989
Zach LaVine: 2015, 2016
Damian Lillard: 2014
Corey Maggette: 2001
Kenyon Martin Jr.: 2023
Desmond Mason: 2001, 2002, 2003
Mac McClung: 2023
JaVale McGee: 2011
Tracy McGrady: 2000
Ben McLemore: 2014
Harold Miner: 1993, 1995
Greg Minor: 1996
Donovan Mitchell: 2018
Jamario Moon: 2008
Chris Morris: 1989
Trey Murphy III: 2023
Larry Nance: 1984, 1985
Larry Nance Jr.: 2018
Victor Oladipo: 2015, 2018
Robert Pack: 1994
Tim Perry: 1989, 1993, 1995
Scottie Pippen: 1990
Mason Plumlee: 2015
Paul Pressey: 1986
Jason Richardson: 2002, 2003, 2004
Isaiah Rider: 1994, 1995
Glenn Robinson III: 2017
James Robinson: 1994
Nate Robinson: 2006, 2007, 2009, 2010
Terrence Ross: 2013, 2014
Ralph Sampson: 1984
Anfernee Simons: 2021
Jericho Sims: 2023
Dennis Smith Jr.: 2018, 2019
J. R. Smith: 2005, 2009
Josh Smith: 2005, 2006
Kenny Smith: 1990, 1991, 1993
Otis Smith: 1988, 1991
Jerry Stackhouse: 1996, 2000
Cassius Stanley: 2021
Terence Stansbury: 1985, 1986, 1987
John Starks: 1992
DeShawn Stevenson: 2001
Amar'e Stoudemire: 2003, 2005
Bob Sura: 1997
Stromile Swift: 2001
Tyrus Thomas: 2007
Billy Thompson: 1990
Obi Toppin: 2021, 2022
Juan Toscano-Anderson: 2022
Terry Tyler: 1986
Kenny "Sky" Walker: 1989, 1990
John Wall: 2014
Gerald Wallace: 2002, 2010
Hakim Warrick: 2006
Jamie Watson: 1995
Clarence Weatherspoon: 1993
Spud Webb: 1986, 1988, 1989
Doug West: 1992
Dominique Wilkins: 1984, 1985, 1986, 1988, 1990
Gerald Wilkins: 1986, 1987
Derrick Williams: 2012
Kenny Williams: 1991
Orlando Woolridge: 1984, 1985

All-time results

1980s
1984

1985

a

1986

a
b

1987

1988Ron Harper (Cleveland) was to participate but withdrew due to injury.

1989
a

1990s
1990

1991Beginning with this year, final round competitors were allowed three dunks, with the two highest scores comprising the total.

1992
a 

1993The two highest score dunks of three in each round constituted the competitor's score.Shawn Kemp (Seattle) was scheduled to compete but was injured.

1994In the first round, each competitor was allowed 90 seconds to do as many dunks as he chooses with one overall score. The final round score was the best of two dunks.

1995This year, each competitor was allowed 90 seconds to do at least three dunks and then given an overall score in round one. In the final round, each competitor was allowed 60 seconds to do at least two dunks and then given an overall score.

1996Beginning this year, in the first round, each competitor was allowed 90 seconds to do as many dunks as he chooses with one overall score. The final round score was the best of two dunks.

1997

1998No competition was held.

1999No competition was held as All-Star Weekend was not held due to the NBA's lockout.

2000s
2000
Beginning with this year, the two highest dunks in each round constituted the competitor's total score.

2001

2002A tournament format was adopted for this year.

2003

2004

2005

2006

2007

2008The final round was decided by fan voting via text messaging for the first time.

2009The final round was decided by fan voting via text messaging.

2010s
2010The final round was decided by fan voting via text messaging.

2011The final round was decided by fan voting via text messaging.

2012The format for this season was changed so that each participant had 3 dunks, and the results would be entirely decided by fan voting online, via text messaging, and (for the first time) via Twitter.

2013The final round was decided by fan voting via text messaging.

2014A team format was adopted this year. The first round was a Freestyle Round, with the winning team choosing the order of dunkers for the Battle Round. The Battle Round was then composed of one-on-one "battles", with the first team to three victories being the champion.

John Wall was voted Dunker of the Night.

2015This year saw the return of the voting style that was last used in 2007.

2016

2017

2018

2019

2020s
2020

2021The final round was decided by judges.

2022

2023

Criticism
Historically, the dunk contest drew some mild criticisms. One is that players who often compete in these contests are seen as dunkers only (with the notable exceptions of Michael Jordan, Kobe Bryant, and Julius Erving), which is why notable high flying athletes like Shawn Marion and LeBron James have sometimes refused to participate. High-profile players such as Dwyane Wade and Charles Barkley have also declined to participate citing it as an unnecessary risk to injury. In the 2000 NBA Slam Dunk Contest, Tracy McGrady injured his wrist while performing a dunk. Also in the 1995 NBA Slam Dunk Contest, Tony Dumas hurt his knee while performing his "Texas Twister" dunk. Although a longtime critic, LeBron James said he would perform in the 2010 Slam Dunk Contest. This decision was made after watching the 2009 dunk contest when Dwight Howard and Nate Robinson went at it. However, he withdrew his statement once the All-Star Weekend came around.

The 2006 NBA Slam Dunk Competition between Nate Robinson and Andre Iguodala drew much criticism because players were not penalized for missing a dunk attempt. Consequently, Robinson attempted a single dunk 14 times before completing it. Prior to the 2007 competition, the NBA changed a few rules to prevent excessive dunk attempts.  Each participant has two minutes to complete their dunk.  At the end of the two minutes allotted, they then have their number of dunk attempts limited to two.

Records
Zach LaVine posted the highest score in any round with 200 in the 2016 final round, as well as the best overall score with 299 points.
28 players have scored at least one perfect 50 on an individual dunk: Julius Erving, Terence Stansbury, Michael Jordan, Dominique Wilkins, Gerald Wilkins, Spud Webb, Jerome Kersey, Cedric Ceballos, Vince Carter, Steve Francis, Tracy McGrady, Jason Richardson, Desmond Mason, Fred Jones, Josh Smith, Amar'e Stoudemire, Andre Iguodala, Nate Robinson, Gerald Green, Dwight Howard, DeMar DeRozan, JaVale McGee, Terrence Ross, Victor Oladipo, Pat Connaughton, Zach LaVine, Aaron Gordon, Glenn Robinson III, Donovan Mitchell, Dennis Smith Jr., Hamidou Diallo, and Mac McClung. Aaron Gordon holds the record with the most perfect 50s, with eight, followed by Zach LaVine with seven, Michael Jordan with six, and Dominique Wilkins and Jason Richardson with five each. From 1989 to 1995, when scoring went by tenths of points, there was only one perfect 50 (Ceballos).
Michael Jordan, Jason Richardson, Nate Robinson, and Zach LaVine are the only players to win the NBA Slam Dunk Contest back-to-back. Michael Jordan, Isaiah Rider, Kobe Bryant, Brent Barry and Dwight Howard are the only players to have won an NBA championship and a slam dunk championship.
Kobe Bryant is the youngest player to win the slam dunk contest at the age of 18.
At 5'6", Spud Webb is the shortest player to win the NBA slam dunk contest. 
Ralph Sampson, at 7'4", is the tallest player to compete in the dunk contest, while Dwight Howard is the tallest winner, at 6'11", though he is now listed at 6'10".
 Nate Robinson is the only player to win the contest three times.
The 2006 NBA Slam Dunk Competition between Nate Robinson and Andre Iguodala was the first time that the competition had to go into a sudden-death dunk-off.
In 1996, Greg Minor of the Boston Celtics received the lowest individual score for a single dunk, with a 2.0 for a missed first attempt.
Spud Webb became the first rookie to win a slam dunk title. He was followed by Dee Brown, Harold Miner, Isaiah Rider, Brent Barry, Kobe Bryant, Desmond Mason, Jason Richardson, Josh Smith, Nate Robinson, Terrence Ross, Zach LaVine, Donovan Mitchell, Hamidou Diallo, and Mac McClung.

References 

National Basketball Association All-Star Game
American Basketball Association
Recurring sporting events established in 1984
Sports entertainment
1984 establishments in the United States